is a passenger railway station in the town of Shisui, Chiba Prefecture, Japan, operated by the East Japan Railway Company (JR East).

Lines
Shisui Station is served by the Narita Line, and is located 6.4  kilometers from the terminus of line at Sakura Station.

Station layout
Shisui Station consists of dual opposed side platforms connected to the station building by a footbridge. The station has a Midori no Madoguchi staffed ticket office.

Platforms

History
Shisui Station was opened on January 19, 1897 as a station on the Narita Railway Company for both freight and passenger operations. The Narita Railway was nationalized on September 1, 1920, becoming part of the Japanese Government Railway (JGR). After World War II, the JGR became the Japan National Railways (JNR). Scheduled freight operations were suspended from November 1, 1961. The station has been unattended since March 15, 1974. The station was absorbed into the JR East network upon the privatization of the Japan National Railways (JNR) on April 1, 1987. A new station building was completed in 1989, allowing the station to be once again staffed.

Passenger statistics
In fiscal 2019, the station was used by an average of 3689 passengers daily (boarding passengers only).

Surrounding area
 Shisui Town Hall
Shisui Municipal Shisui Junior High School
 Shisui Municipal Omurodai Elementary School

See also
 List of railway stations in Japan

References

External links

JR East station information 

Railway stations in Japan opened in 1897
Railway stations in Chiba Prefecture
Narita Line
Shisui